Miejski Klub Sportowy Znicz Pruszków is a football club based in Pruszków, Poland.

Famous players
The best known player from Znicz Pruszków is Robert Lewandowski, who played for Znicz from 2006 to 2008, being top scorer of the league in both his seasons in the club and helping the team achieve promotion to the I Liga in 2007

Current squad

Domestic record

References

External links
 
 Unofficial website
 Znicz Pruszków on 90minut.pl

 
Association football clubs established in 1923
1923 establishments in Poland
Pruszków County
Football clubs in Masovian Voivodeship
Sport in Masovian Voivodeship